La Fin du Monde is the second album by the Toronto-based instrumental band The Hylozoists.

Track listing
"The Fifty Minute Hour"
"Elementary Particles"
"Smiley Smiley"
"Strait is the Gate"
"Hearts and Harps"
"Warning Against Judging a Christian Brother"
"If Only Your Heart Was a Major Sixth"
"Man Who Almost Was"
"Lover Becomes Lovers"
"Journey to the End of the Night"
"La Fin du Monde"

External links
La Fin Du Monde at Boompa Store

2006 albums
The Hylozoists albums